The Prague Orgy (1985) is a novella by Philip Roth. The short book is the epilogue to his trilogy Zuckerman Bound. The story follows Roth's alter ego Nathan Zuckerman, on a journey to Communist Prague in 1976 seeking the unpublished manuscripts of a Yiddish writer. The book, presented as journal entries by Zuckerman, details the struggle of demoralized artists in a totalitarian society.

1985 American novels
Novels by Philip Roth
Fiction set in the 1970s
Novels set in Prague
Jonathan Cape books